Medkila is part of the town of Harstad within Harstad Municipality in Troms county, Norway. The name of the area was previously spelled Midkila and Mekile.

Medkila's women's football team won the Norwegian Football Cup in 2003.  Medkila skole, an elementary school, is also located in the area.

References

Harstad